The Zhejiang Golden Bulls, or Zhejiang Chouzhou Golden Rent are a Chinese professional basketball team based in Yiwu in Zhejiang, China. It competes in the Chinese Basketball Association (CBA), in the Southern Division. Its corporate sponsor is Zhejiang Chouzhou Commercial Bank.

The team continued to be informally referred to as the Horses for quite some time, even after changing its nickname to Cyclones in 2001, largely because of the corporate sponsor during that era, Wanma (万马), whose name literally translates into English as ten thousand horses. The club plays most of its home games at the Yiwu Gymnasium but occasionally hosts contests at other locations in Zhejiang Province.

During the 2020–21 Chinese Basketball Association season, under head coach Liu Weiwei the Golden Bulls reached the semifinals for the first time in history. <small>

Name progression
 Zhejiang Zhongxin Hangshou Squirrels: (1995–99)
 Zhejiang Whirlwinds: (1999–00)
 Zhejiang Horses: (2000–01)
 Zhejiang Wanma Cyclones: (2001–2009)
 Zhejiang Golden Bulls: (since 2009)

Roster

Notable players

This is a list of the team's leading current Chinese and International players as well as notable former Chinese and International players.

Current Chinese national team players
  Lu Wenbo (2017–present)
  Wu Qian (2012–present)

Current Hong Kong players
  Duncan Reid (2017–present)

Current International players
 Justin Tillman (2022–present)

Former Chinese players
  Ding Jinhui (2006–2016)

Former international players

  God Shammgod (2001–2002, 2007–2008)
  Peter Cornell (2003–2004)
  Isaac Fontaine (2004–2005)
  Soumaila Samake (2004–2006)
  Curtis Millage (2005–2006)
  Kevin Freeman (2006–2007)
  Kirk Snyder (2008–2009)
  Marcus Williams (2009–2010)
  Andre Brown (2009–2010)
  Josh Boone (2010–2012)
  Denzel Bowles (2012–2013)
  Mike James (2010)
  J.R. Smith (2011–2012)
  Eddy Curry (2012–2013)
  Quincy Douby (2012–2013)
  Jerel McNeal (2013)
  Dewarick Spencer (2013)
  Ivan Johnson (2013–2014)
  Mike Harris (2013)
  Brittney Griner (2013-2014)
  Errick McCollum (2014–2015)
  Chris Johnson (2014)
  Willie Warren (2015–2016)
  Charles Gaines (2016)
  Samad Nikkhah Bahrami (2015–2016)
  Cady Lalanne (2016)
  Lorenzo Brown (2016–2017)
  Jarnell Stokes (2017–2018)
 Sonny Weems (2017–2022)
 Arinze Onuaku (2018–2022)
 Erick Green (2021–2022)

References

External links
 Team profile on Sports.Sina.com.cn website(in Chinese)

 
Chinese Basketball Association teams
Sport in Zhejiang
Basketball teams established in 1995